Per Husted Nielsen (born 6 April 1966) is a Danish politician and member of the Folketing, the national legislature. A Social Democrat, he has represented North Jutland since November 2022. He had previously been a member of the Folketing between January 2010 and September 2011. He has also served as a substitute member of the Folketing on several occasions.

Husted was born on 6 April 1966 in Kolding. He was educated at Munkensdam Upper Secondary School and Kolding Købmandsskole. He has a Master of Science degree in economics and business administration from Copenhagen Business School (1993). He was Trade Promotion Officer for the Hadsund Trade Council from 1996 to 2006. He taught at Tradium Business School and Tradium Hobro Afdeling from 2006 to 2021. He has been a member of the municipal council in Mariagerfjord Municipality since 2022, having previously been a member from 2014 to 2018.

Husted is married to Lene Kolding Abrahamsen and has two children.

References

External links

1966 births
Copenhagen Business School alumni
Danish municipal councillors
Living people
Members of the Folketing 2007–2011
Members of the Folketing 2022–2026
People from Mariagerfjord Municipality
Social Democrats (Denmark) politicians